Markus Ferdinand Hantschk (born 19 November 1977) is a German former tennis player who was active between 1996 and 2006. He reached two singles finals in ATP tournaments, both in 2000.

ATP career finals

Singles: 2 (2 runners-up)

ATP Challenger and ITF Futures finals

Singles: 8 (2–6)

Doubles: 3 (1–2)

Performance timeline

Singles

References

External links 
 
 
 Official web site 

1977 births
Living people
German male tennis players
People from Dachau
Sportspeople from Upper Bavaria
Tennis people from Bavaria